Outline of demography contains human demography and population related important concepts and high-level aggregated lists compiled in the useful categories.

The subheadings have been grouped by the following 4 categories:

 Meta (lit. "highest" level) units, such as the universal important concepts related to demographics and places. 
 Macro (lit. "high" level) units where the "whole world" is the smallest unit of measurement, such as the aggregated summary demographics at global level. For example, United Nations.
 Meso (lit. "middle" or "intermediate" level) units where the smallest unit of measurement cover more than one nation and more than one continent but not all the nations or continents. For example, summary list at continental level, e.g. Eurasia and Latin America or Middle East which cover two or more continents. Other examples include the intercontinental organisations e.g. the Commonwealth of Nations or the organisation of Arab states.
 Micro (lit. "lower" or "smaller") level units where country is the smallest unit of measurement, such as the "globally aggregated lists" by the "individual countries" .

Please do not add sections on the items that are the nano (lit. "minor" or "tiny") level units as per the context described above, e.g. list of things within a city must be kept out.

Meta or important concepts

Global human population 

 World population 
 Demographics of the world
 Fertility and intelligence
 Human geography
 Geographic mobility
 Globalization
 Human migration
 List of lists on linguistics

Impact of human population 

 Human impact on the environment 
 Biological dispersal
 Carrying capacity
 Doomsday argument
 Environmental migrant
 Human overpopulation
 Malthusian catastrophe
 List of countries by carbon dioxide emissions
 List of countries by carbon dioxide emissions per capita
 List of countries by greenhouse gas emissions
 List of countries by greenhouse gas emissions per capita
 Overconsumption
 Overexploitation
 Population ecology

Continuation of human species

Sustainable and secure optimum human population 

 Birth control
 Family planning
 Human population planning
 Human security
 Ideal free distribution
 Survivability
 Survivorship curve

Sustainable food security 

 Food security
 Geography of food
 Nutritional economics
 Sustainable agriculture

Sustainability 

 Climate change
 Environmental Sustainability
 List of climate scientists
 List of global sustainability statistics
 List of renewable energy topics by country and territory
 List of environmental academic degrees
 List of sustainability programs in North America
 Voluntary Human Extinction Movement

Macro or highest level global lists 

These are macro (high or top) level lists.

Global lists of historical populations 

 Historical demography
 Population reconstruction
 List of largest empires
 List of richest nations throughout history 
 List of largest historical cities by chronology

World summary lists

 World population
 List of continents by population
 List of regional organizations by population
 List of religious populations
 List of unrecognized countries
 List of micronations

Meso or intermediate level sub-global lists 

These meso (middle or intermediate) level lists are 
 "supra-national" (more than one continent "and" more than one nation), but 
 "sub-global" (but not all nations "or" all continents).

Intercontinental lists 

This is aggregated list of demographics and places spanning across more than one continent but not across all the nations.

 Americas
 Arab states
 Commonwealth of Nations
 Eurasia
 Latin America
 Middle East

Summary lists aggregated by continents 

This is aggregated list by individual subcontinent.

Asia 
This is aggregated list of Asia subcontinent.

 List of Asian countries by population
 Population density of Asian countries
 List of urban agglomerations in Asia
 List of metropolitan areas in Asia

Africa 
This is aggregated list of Africa subcontinent.

 List of African countries by population
 List of African countries by population density

Europe 
This is aggregated list of Europe subcontinent.

 List of European countries by population and area
 List of the European Union members by density

North America 
This is aggregated list of North America subcontinent.

 List of North American countries by population
 List of sovereign states and dependent territories in North America by population density

South America 
This is aggregated list of South America subcontinent.

 List of South American countries by population
 List of sovereign states and dependent territories in South America by population density

Oceania 
This is aggregated list of Oceania as subcontinent. 
 

 List of Oceanian countries by population
 Population density of countries in Oceania

Micro or lover level global lists

Global lists aggregated by countries 
This is "aggregated global" list by countries. Do not put the list of individual countries in his section.

 List of list of countries and regions
 Lists of countries by GDP
 List of countries by population
 List of countries by population (United Nations)
 List of countries by population density
 List of countries by past and future population
 List of countries by real population density based on food growing capacity
 List of countries by population growth rate
 List of countries by fertility rate
 List of countries by median age
 List of countries by refugee population

Global lists aggregated by subdivisions of countries 
This is aggregated "global" list of subdivisions by countries.

 List of the largest country subdivisions by area
 List of political and geographic subdivisions by total area
 List of country second level subdivisions by area
 List of country third-level subdivisions by area

Global lists aggregated by urban areas of countries 
This is aggregated "global" list of urban areas by countries.

 Urbanization
 Transborder agglomeration
 List of countries by urban population
 List of largest cities by population
 List of largest cities by density
 List of divided cities
 Lists of list of cities
 Lists of list of places
 Lists of list of Settlements

Lists of individual countries 

This is list is related only to individual countries, i.e. create separate subsection for each country. Please help expand this incomplete list by adding more nations.

Bangladesh 

 Demographics of Bangladesh.
 List of cities and towns in Bangladesh by population
 List of villages in Bangladesh

Brazil 

 Demographics of Brazil
 List of Brazilian states by area
 List of Brazilian states by murder rate
 List of cities in Brazil by population
 List of Brazilian states by population

China 

 Demographics of China
 List of Chinese administrative divisions by population
 List of cities in China by population

India 

 Demographics of India
 List of cities in India by population
 List of million-plus agglomerations in India
 List of metropolitan areas in India
 List of states and union territories of India by population
 List of towns in India by population

Indonesia 

 Demographics of Indonesia
 Provinces of Indonesia
 List of Indonesian cities by population
 List of Indonesian islands by population

Pakistan 

 Demographic history of Pakistan
 Demographics of Pakistan
 List of cities in Pakistan by population
 Ethnic groups in Pakistan

Russia 

 Demographics of Russia
 List of cities and towns in Russia by population
 List of federal subjects of Russia by population

USA

 Demographics of United States
 List of states and territories of the United States by population

See also 

 List of lists of lists
 List of lists

References

List of population related meta concepts and meta lists 

Lists of countries by continent, by population
Lists of countries by continent
Lists of countries by population
Lists of countries by large sub or trans-continental region, by population
Lists of countries in the Americas
Lists of countries in Africa
Lists of countries in Asia
Demographics of North America
Demographics of South America
Countries in Oceania
Demographics of Oceania
Population related
Sustainability lists
Human overpopulation
Lists of countries by population density
Lists by population density
Population ecology
World population

Lists of geography lists
Demography
Wikipedia outlines